Robert Herold (13 November 1910 – 19 October 1969) was a French gymnast. He competed in eight events at the 1936 Summer Olympics.

References

1910 births
1969 deaths
French male artistic gymnasts
Olympic gymnasts of France
Gymnasts at the 1936 Summer Olympics
Sportspeople from Strasbourg
20th-century French people